Helena Vurnik née Kottler (1882-1962) was a Slovenian artist born in the Austro-Hungarian Empire, best known for decorative paintings on Cooperative Business Bank facade and its interior.

Life
She was born in Vienna to a father Moritz Kottler, a Post Office lawyer, and mother Bronislawa, who was from Poland. She was educated first at 'Graphische Lehr und Versuchsanstalt', then 'Kunstschule für Frauen und Mädchen', and finished Vienna School of Arts and Crafts.

Work
After study in 1910, she won a scholarship to study art in a vicinity of Modena in Italy for five-months. She sold paintings she painted in Italy upon returning to Vienna and she rented an art studio. In 1913, she met her future husband, Ivan Vurnik, while both were drawing salamanders for biologist Franc Megušar at his home. She left her job as an illustrator for 'Illustrirtes Wiener Extrablatt' newspaper, and moved with Ivan Vurnik to work with him first to Trieste, then Ljubljana, and at the end to Radovljica.

In media and books
A script for the documentary film "Iskalca" directed by Alma Lapajne and screened on RTV Slovenia and a book about her and her husband were written by Boris Leskovec.

References

External links
 Article about the artist in a biographical lexicon of Slovenia (in Slovene)
 The 2017 Exhibition about the artist in National Gallery of Slovenia (in Slovene)

1882 births
1962 deaths
Painters from the Austro-Hungarian Empire
Slovenian women artists
Yugoslav painters